Events from the year 1477 in France

Incumbents
 Monarch – Louis XI

Events
 5 January – Battle of Nancy

Births

25 January – Anne of Brittany, Duchess of Brittany (died 1514).

Deaths

Full date missing
Johannes Fedé, composer (born c, 1415)
Louis II de Beaumont-Bressuire, chamberlain (born 1407)
Charles the Bold, Duke of Burgundy (born 1433)
Jean V de Bueil, count of Sancerre, viscount of Carentan (born 1406)

See also

References

External links

1470s in France